Mark Harwell is an American biologist currently at Texas A&M University and an Elected Fellow of the American Association for the Advancement of Science.

References

Fellows of the American Association for the Advancement of Science
Texas A&M University faculty
21st-century American biologists
Living people
Year of birth missing (living people)